Aldouane is an unincorporated community in the Canadian province of New Brunswick; a Local Service District to the east takes its name from the Aldouane River, a former name of the Rivière Saint-Charles, and Aldouane Lake, a former name of Northwest Branch.

History

Alouane was settled in 1790, being a village of around fifteen families.

See also
List of communities in New Brunswick
List of people from Kent County, New Brunswick

References

Communities in Kent County, New Brunswick
Designated places in New Brunswick
Local service districts of Kent County, New Brunswick